Captain Newman, M.D. is a 1963 American comedy drama film directed by David Miller and starring Gregory Peck, Tony Curtis, Angie Dickinson, Robert Duvall, Eddie Albert and Bobby Darin. Peck's  Brentwood Production also co-produced the film.

The film is based on the 1961 novel by Leo Rosten. It was loosely based on the World War II experiences of Rosten's close friend Ralph Greenson, M.D., while Greenson was a captain in the Army Medical Corps supporting the U.S. Army Air Forces and stationed at Yuma Army Airfield in Yuma, Arizona. Greenson is well known for his work on "empathy" and was one of the first in his field to seriously associate posttraumatic stress disorder (years before that terminology was developed) with wartime experiences. He was a director of the Los Angeles Psychoanalytic Institute and was a practicing Freudian. Greenson is perhaps best known for his patients, who included Marilyn Monroe, Frank Sinatra, Tony Curtis and Vivien Leigh.

Major filming took place at the U.S. Army's Fort Huachuca complex in southern Arizona, with the co-located Libby Army Airfield used to portray the fictional Colfax Army Air Field.

The story was used as a 1972 television pilot of the same title produced by Danny Thomas Productions starring Jim Hutton in the title role and Joan Van Ark as Lt Corum.

Plot
In 1944, Captain Josiah Newman is head of the neuro-psychiatric Ward 7 at the Colfax Army Air Field (AAF) military hospital, located in the Arizona desert. As he explains to a visiting VIP who wanders in: "We're short of beds, doctors, orderlies, nurses, everything ... except patients." He will use unconventional tactics to treat his patients and to recruit much needed personnel, as when he hijacks a new and very reluctant orderly, Corporal Jackson Leibowitz, a wheeler-dealer from New Jersey. Leibowitz promptly has the entire ward participating in a sing-along of "Old MacDonald Had a Farm."

Newman also takes great pains to court nurse Lieutenant Francie Corum on what she thinks is a date... until he asks her to transfer to Ward 7. Their 'date/fight' is cut short by a phone call: Colonel Bliss has forced his way into Ward 7 looking for Dr. Newman with a 6-inch knife, because Newman blocked his return to active duty after witnessing Bliss' erratic behavior. After watching Newman's handling of this situation and other patients on the ward, Corum transfers in.

Newman treats shell-shocked, schizophrenic and catatonic patients, facing an especial challenge from the traumatized Corporal Jim Tompkins, an Eighth Air Force air gunner whose mind has been shattered by his war experiences. Newman is bedeviled by Colfax AAF's "old-school" base commander, Colonel Pyser, who ultimately saddles him with a complement of injured Italian POWs because his is the only secure ward in the hospital. In addition, a flock of constantly straying sheep (kept for the medical lab) that find their way to the airfield and a set of feuding orderlies keeps life interesting right up to Christmas 1944.

Cast
 Gregory Peck as Capt. Josiah J. Newman, M.D., MC, USAR
 Tony Curtis as Cpl. Jackson 'Jake' Leibowitz, USAAF, de facto boss of the orderlies
 Angie Dickinson as 1st Lt. Francie Corum, NC, USAR
 Eddie Albert as Col. Norval Algate Bliss, USAAF
 Bobby Darin as Cpl. Jim Tompkins, USAAF
 Robert Duvall as Capt. Paul Cabots Winston
 Bethel Leslie as Mrs Helene Winston
 James Gregory as Col. Edgar Pyser, USAAF
 Dick Sargent as Lt. Belden 'Barney' Alderson
 Larry Storch as Cpl. Gavoni
 Jane Withers as 1st Lt. Grace Blodgett
 Vito Scotti as Maj. Alfredo Fortuno, Italian POW Senior Officer
 Gregory Walcott as Capt. Howard
 Robert F. Simon as Col. M. B. Larrabee
 Paul Carr as Arthur Werbel
 Charlie Briggs as Gorkow
 Barry Atwater as Major Dawes

Awards and nominations
The film was nominated for three Academy Awards.
 Best Supporting Actor (nomination) – Bobby Darin
 Best Sound – Waldon O. Watson
 Writing (Screenplay – based on material from another medium) — Richard L. Breen, Henry Ephron, Phoebe Ephron

1972 TV pilot
An attempt was made to turn the film into a TV sitcom by Thomas-Crenna Productions, the company of Danny Thomas and Richard Crenna. A pilot was shot in 1972, written by Frank Tarloff. It aired on 19 August 1972. The Los Angeles Times said "it was easy to see why it was never sold."

Cast
Jim Hutton as Captain Newman
Joan Van Ark as Lt Francie Corwin
Bill Fiore as Captain Norval Bliss

See also
 List of American films of 1963

References

External links
 
 

1963 films
1960s war comedy-drama films
American war comedy-drama films
Films about psychoanalysis
Films directed by David Miller
Films set in Yuma, Arizona
Films shot in Arizona
Military humor in film
Universal Pictures films
American World War II films
Films scored by Frank Skinner
1960s English-language films
1960s American films